E3000 may refer to:
 Eurostar E3000, a satellite platform manufactured by Airbus
 A variant of the HP 3000, a minicomputer line manufactured by Hewlett-Packard